Apozol is one of the 58 municipalities in the state of Zacatecas, Mexico.

It is located on the southern part of the state of Zacatecas and it is bounded by the municipalities of Jalpa, Juchipila, Nochistlán de Mejía, Tepechitlán and Teúl de González Ortega.

. The municipality makes up for 0.68% of the area of the state of Zacatecas.

References

Municipalities of Zacatecas